Andrea Moor is a Brisbane-based actor known for with roles in theatre, film and television. She is also a stage director and coordinator of actor training at QUT (Queensland University of Technology).

Early career to mid-2000s 
Moor was born in Melbourne, raised in Queensland and moved to Sydney in 1979. At 19 she travelled to London to study at East 15 and returned to Sydney after a year. She enrolled at the National Institute of Dramatic Art (NIDA) and graduated in 1985.

She appeared in productions by all the major Sydney theatre companies including, Sydney Theatre Company, Ensemble Theatre, Stables Theatre, Marion Street Theatre and Belvoir. She travelled to England with the Sydney Theatre Company production of David Williamson's play Emerald City.

Moor was also appearing in films and on television including 59 episodes in the series Heartbreak High.  She was also at times listed as Andrea Moore.

Career 2005– 
Moor's parents were residents of Brisbane and following her father's death she moved back to Brisbane with her family to be closer to her mother.

She subsequently appeared in many productions for Brisbane-based theatre companies La Boite and Queensland Theatre Company.

While continuing as an actor Moor moved into directing from 2007 as an assistant director. In late 2008 she had her  first role as director with the production of Beautiful at the Loft.   She directed plays for the Queensland Theatre Company and in 2014-2015 she was appointed a Resident Director at Queensland Theatre Company a joint position with Jason Klarwein. The role included "working on a range of projects from mainstage productions to works in development, youth programs and repertoire meetings." For the second half of 2015 Moor's role moved to being Artistic Associate. Of the role of director Moor said, "While I love directing, and still find it incredibly challenging, at my heart I'm an actor."

Teaching 
Moor had studied at the Atlantic Theatre Company in New York City, the acting school founded by David Mamet and William H Macy, which uses a technique known as Practical Aesthetics, the Atlantic Technique.

Moor introduced this technique to Australia in 1994 and in 1998 she together with Melissa Bruder established “the official Sydney Annex of the NYC.” She has run workshops on the technique at NIDA, Western Australian Academy of Performing Arts (WAAPA), Queensland University of Technology (QUT), London Academy of Music and Dramatic Art (LAMDA), and Practical Aesthetics Australia (PAA) and in group settings.

She had been offered teaching roles in institutions but wanted to investigate further on techniques to teach acting. In 2013 she was awarded her PhD as a Doctorate of Creative Industries. Her thesis was entitled "Contemporary Actor Training in Australia: A comparative survey of the efficacy of the acting methodologies implemented at four leading Australian actor-training institutions - National Institute of Dramatic Art, Queensland University of Technology, Victorian College of the Arts, and Western Australian Academy of Performing Arts." She then accepted a five-year role as senior lecturer and head of acting at Queensland University of Technology.

Moor describes her career as "reinventing myself or adding strings to my bow just in order to survive." She said that the combination of acting, directing and teaching will not lead to a secure financial future where she would have sufficient money to retire while a permanent teaching position offers more financial stability. Her studies had the unexpected advantage of giving her greater insight into her own work as an actor and director. She is on the boards of Queensland Theatre (formerly Queensland Theatre Company) and Metro Arts.

In 2014 she was awarded a Churchill Fellowship.

Review acting 
Maureen Strugnell in a review in Stage Diary wrote of Moor's performance in Vincent in Brixton as the mother of Vincent Van Gogh,Andrea Moor is compelling in this role, suggesting by everything she does the effort that it takes to keep on functioning in a world that has lost all meaning. Whether she is rushing manically about the kitchen as in the opening scene, or moving with achingly painful slowness as the depression takes hold again, we watch fascinated. When she sits still, head in hands, she personifies despair and prefigures later portraits by Van Gogh of sorrowing women.

Awards 
2005 nominated Matilda Awards The Actors' Workshop Awards for Performance by a Female Actor in a Supporting Role : Vincent in Brixton
2007 nominated Matilda Awards Best Actress : Who's Afraid of Virginia Woolf?
2008 nominated Matilda Awards Best Actress in a Lead Role : The Narcissist
2009 winner Matilda Awards Best Actress in a Supporting Role : The Crucible
2013 winner Gold Matilda Award for directing Venus in Fur
2013 nominated Matilda Awards Best Director Venus in Fur
2015 nominated Matilda Awards Best Director : Grounded
2016 winner Matilda Awards Best Female Actor : Switzerland

Personal life 
Moor lives in Ashgrove Brisbane with her husband and their teenage daughter Bella.

Theatre – Actor 
Selected performances

Theatre – Director 
Selected performances

Filmography

FILM

TELEVISION

References

Living people
Queensland University of Technology alumni
Australian stage actresses
Australian theatre directors
Year of birth missing (living people)